Okhotnik may refer to:
The Hunter (2011 Russian film)
Aero-Astra Okhotnik, a Russian autogyro 
Vladimir Okhotnik (born 1950), French chess grandmaster
Okhotnik class, a Russian destroyer class
Rubin-class patrol boat, a Russian patrol boat class
Sukhoi S-70 Okhotnik, a Russian stealth unmanned combat aerial vehicle (UCAV) in development